The Administration and Works Committee was a select committee of the House of Lords with a remit to consider administrative services, accommodation, and works within the financial and strategic framework set by the House Committee.

It was replaced with the Services Committee in August 2016.

See also
List of Committees of the United Kingdom Parliament

External links
The records of the Administration and Works Committee are held by the UK Parliamentary Archives
Administration and Works Committee (Lords) − UK Parliament

Committees of the House of Lords